The Fatal Hour may refer to:

 The Fatal Hour (1908 film), directed by D. W. Griffith
 The Fatal Hour (1920 film), a lost 1920 film directed by George W. Terwilliger
 The Fatal Hour (1937 film), a British film directed by George Pearson
 The Fatal Hour (1940 film), starring Boris Karloff

See also
 The Sleeping Cardinal, a 1931 British mystery film released in the US as Sherlock Holmes' Fatal Hour
 Two Against the World (1936 film), a Humphrey Bogart film also known as One Fatal Hour